Ohaton is a hamlet in central Alberta, Canada within Camrose County. Previously an incorporated municipality, Ohaton dissolved from village status on January 1, 1946.

The Ohaton post office was opened in 1906 with the name "Ohaton" being a portmanteau of the partners Osler, Hammond and Nanton of a notable Winnipeg financial firm. Nanton, another community in Alberta, is also named for Augustus Meredith Nanton of the same firm.

Ohaton and area's topography is rounded hills with a small river valley running through its southern portion. The surrounding area is mostly farmed with grain and canola or ranched with predominantly cattle.

Demographics 

See also 
List of communities in Alberta
List of designated places in Alberta
List of former urban municipalities in Alberta
List of hamlets in Alberta

References 

Camrose County
Hamlets in Alberta
Designated places in Alberta
Former villages in Alberta